Alexandra Lynn (born 3 March 1995), known professionally as Alex the Astronaut, is an Australian folk-pop singer-songwriter.

Her debut album The Theory of Absolutely Nothing was released on 21 August 2020, and peaked at number 22 on the ARIA Album's Chart. Her second studio album How to Grow a Sunflower Underwater was released on 22 July 2022.

Lynn has her own record label, Minkowski Records, which was named after the Minkowski diagram.

Early life
Lynn graduated from Pymble Ladies' College in Sydney before studying maths and physics at Long Island University, New York, including a thesis on sonoluminescence, where she played soccer for the LIU Post Pioneers as a forward.

Career

2017–2018: To Whom It May Concern and See You Soon
Lynn released her debut EP To Whom It May Concern as Alex the Astronaut in 2017. The EP features the single "Already Home", which was described by HuffPost Australia as "a melancholy number about a bus ride and ruminations on the mundanities of life".

Lynn's second EP See You Soon featured the single "Not Worth Hiding", and was nominated for a J Award for Unearthed Artist of the Year in 2017.

"Not Worth Hiding" ranked at number 23 on Triple J Hottest 100 and it described as an unofficial anthem for the "Yes" campaign in the Australian Marriage Law Postal Survey.

Lynn performed at The Great Escape Festival in Brighton, UK, and at the Primavera Sound Festival in Barcelona. Alex the Astronaut commenced her first national Australian headline tour in November 2018.

2019–2020: The Theory of Absolutely Nothing 
Lynn released the single "I Like To Dance" on 8 August 2019. which Brooklyn Vegan described as "tuneful folk-pop to tell a haunting story".

In January 2020, Alex the Astronaut released the single "I Think You're Great" and "Split the Sky" in April. The track references the film franchise, Harry Potter, in the opening line where Lynn sings "I've been colder, watching Harry Potter looking older". Alex The Astronaut tweeted the inspiration upon release, and James and Oliver Phelps, who played the Weasley twins, both retweeted the post.

In May 2020, Lynn announced her album The Theory of Absolutely Nothing, scheduled for release on 21 August 2020, and released a subsequent single titled "Lost". 

The Theory of Absolutely Nothing was released on 21 August 2020, with Lynn releasing the single "Caught in the Middle" on the same day. The accompanying music video for the single features an appearance from Lindy Morrison of the Go-Betweens, and shows the two playing tennis and drumming competitively. The Line of Best Fit described her debut album as "a record packed full of vibrant, witty, insightful and heart-rending storytelling, all hooked around rich and tender folk-pop melodies". NME Australia praised the album as a "dynamic, ambitious debut" and gave it a five-star review.

2021–present: How to Grow a Sunflower Underwater
On 19 November 2021, Lynn released "Growing Up" which according to triple j, is her "favourite, most honest song she's written". Its sequel "Airport" was released in January 2022. On 3 March 2022, Lynn released "Octopus" and announced the release of her second studio album, How to Grow a Sunflower Underwater.

Personal life
Lynn identifies as gay. She was diagnosed with ASD in May 2021.

Musical style and influences
Lynn's music has been described as folk pop and folktronica, and has drawn comparisons to Australian musician Paul Kelly.

Reception
Lynn has been described as one of Australia's "most powerful and important songwriters".

Discography

Studio albums

Live albums

Extended plays

Singles

As lead artist

As featured artist

Notes

Awards and nominations

AIR Awards
The Australian Independent Record Awards (known colloquially as the AIR Awards) is an annual awards night to recognise, promote and celebrate the success of Australia's independent music sector.

! 
|-
! scope="row"| 2018
| See You Soon
| Best Independent Album
| 
| 
|}

ARIA Music Awards
The ARIA Music Awards is an annual awards ceremony that recognises excellence, innovation, and achievement across all genres of the music of Australia. Alex the Astronaut has received one nomination.

! 
|-
| 2020
| The Theory of Absolutely Nothing
| Breakthrough Artist – Release
|  
| 
|-
| rowspan="2"| 2022
| How to Grow a Sunflower Underwater
| Best Adult Contemporary Album
| 
| rowspan="2"| 
|-
| Giulia Giannini McGauran for Alex the Astronaut How to Grow a Sunflower Underwater
| Best Cover Art
| 
|-
|}

J Awards
The J Awards are an annual series of Australian music awards that were established by the Australian Broadcasting Corporation's youth-focused radio station Triple J. They commenced in 2005.

! 
|-
! scope="row"| 2017
| Herself
| Unearthed Artist of the Year
| 
| 
|}

National Live Music Awards
The National Live Music Awards (NLMAs) are a broad recognition of Australia's diverse live industry, celebrating the success of the Australian live scene. The awards commenced in 2016.

! 
|-
| rowspan="2"| 2018
| rowspan="2"| Herself
| Best New Act
| 
| rowspan="2"| 
|-
| People's Choice – Best Live Voice of the Year
| 
|}

References

External links
 
 

1995 births
Australian women singer-songwriters
Australian women's soccer players
Women's association football forwards
21st-century Australian women singers
Living people
LIU Post Pioneers women's soccer players
Musicians from Sydney
21st-century Australian singers
Australian lesbian musicians
Australian LGBT singers
Australian LGBT songwriters
Lesbian singers
Lesbian songwriters
People on the autism spectrum